Powells Point is an unincorporated community in Currituck County, North Carolina, United States. It lies at an elevation of 10 feet (3 m).

References

Named after Hobson Powell, original member of the Jamestown colony.

Unincorporated communities in Currituck County, North Carolina
Unincorporated communities in North Carolina